Shubhanshu Vijay (born 19 December 1986) is an Indian first-class cricketer who represented Rajasthan. He made his first-class debut for Rajasthan in the 2006-07 Ranji Trophy on 10 January 2007.

References

External links
 

1986 births
Living people
Indian cricketers
Rajasthan cricketers